"Brand New Bitch" (also known under its clean title "Brand New Chick") is a song written and recorded by Canadian singer-songwriter Anjulie. It was co-written by Michel Zitron and was produced by J.O.B. The song was released to digital retailers via Universal Republic Records on May 23, 2011.

"Brand New Chick" achieved moderate commercial success in Canada – it was certified Platinum by Music Canada and reached number 16 on the Billboard Canadian Hot 100. The song was a hit in dance venues, reaching number three on the US Billboard Hot Dance Club Songs chart as well as 24 on the now-defunct Global Dance Songs survey. At the 2012 Juno Awards, the track was nominated for Dance Recording of the Year but lost out to "Hello" by Martin Solveig and Dragonette.

Commercial performance
"Brand New Bitch" debuted at number eighty-four on the Billboard Canadian Hot 100 for the week ending July 2, 2011. It reached its peak position of sixteen for the week ending September 24, 2011. The song peaked at number nineteen on the Hot Canadian Digital Songs component chart in October 2011. Though its peak positions are unverifiable, "Brand New Bitch" rose to at least 7 on the Canada CHR/Top 40 and number 12 on the Canada Hot AC formats, according to archived charts compiled by Nielsen Broadcast Data Systems. In November 2011, "Brand New Bitch" was certified Platinum by Music Canada for digital sales exceeding 80,000 units.

In the United States, "Brand New Bitch" debuted at number thirty-six on the Billboard Hot Dance Club Songs chart for the week ending October 29, 2011 and peaked at number 3 on the chart dated December 17, 2011. It is her fourth consecutive top-ten hit on the chart, and was her last single to appear on the chart as of June 2015. The song additionally charted at number twenty-four on the now-defunct Global Dance Songs chart compiled by Billboard which ranked songs by airplay in nightclubs.

Music video
The official music video for "Brand New Bitch" was directed by Hannah Lux Davis and premiered August 11, 2011. In the video, Anjulie portrays a woman who is resurrected in a laboratory illuminated by neon nightclub-inspired lights, inspired loosely by the story of Frankenstein.

Track listings
Digital download — single 
 "Brand New Bitch" – 3:31

Digital download — single 
 "Brand New Chick" – 3:32

Brand New Bitch (The Remixes) — EP
 "Brand New Bitch" – 3:31
 "Brand New Bitch (LBL Extended Remix)" – 5:44
 "Brand New Bitch (LBL Radio Remix)" – 3:16
 "Brand New Bitch (Love Automatic Remix)" – 6:01
 "Brand New Bitch (Hoxx Whores Remix)" – 6:49
 "Brand New Bitch (Micky Fortune Remix)" – 5:32
 "Brand New Bitch (Black Cards Remix)" – 4:26

Charts and certifications

Weekly charts

Year-end charts

Certifications

Release history

References

2011 singles
Dance-pop songs
Music videos directed by Hannah Lux Davis
Songs written by Michel Zitron
2011 songs
Universal Republic Records singles
Songs written by Anjulie
Electropop songs